The Wisconsin Secure Program Facility (WSPF), originally the Supermax Correctional Institution, is a Wisconsin Department of Corrections prison for men, located in Boscobel, Wisconsin, US. The facility is located east of central Boscobel, off of Wisconsin Highway 133.

The prison has a capacity of 500. As of November 2022, the population is 372.

History 
In November 1999, the WSPF opened as the Supermax Correctional Institution on a  site.

In October 2003, the prison was renamed to the Wisconsin Secure Program Facility.

In 2009, the Associated Press filed a lawsuit against WIDOC, trying to force the agency to release a video of an explosion of a stinger grenade launched into a prisoner's cell. The video was eventually released, the AP was awarded legal fees, and the inmate settled an excessive force lawsuit with the Wisconsin DOC for US$49,000.

See also 
List of Wisconsin state prisons

Notable inmates 
 Christopher Scarver (1999–2001; now at Centennial Correctional Facility in Colorado)
 Eric Hainstock

References

External links 
 "Wisconsin Secure Program Facility." Wisconsin Department of Corrections.

Prisons in Wisconsin
Buildings and structures in Grant County, Wisconsin
1999 establishments in Wisconsin